Sugabala or Sügebala (died 1327) was an empress consort of the Yuan dynasty, married to Gegeen Khan (Emperor Yingzong).

Life 
She was born to Ashi Küregen from Ikires clan of Khongirad tribe and Princess Ilig Qaya, daughter of Temür Khan. His father Ashi was son of Buqa of Ikires and Princess Ulujin, daughter of Kublai khan and Chabi khatun. She had 7 brothers and a sister - Yilianzhenbala, who was khatun of Yesün Temür. She was created empress in 1321 but this lasted short as Gegeen Khan was assassinated 2 years later. She was given posthumous title Empress Zhuāngjìngyì Shèng by Yesün Temür after her death.

References 

Year of birth missing
1327 deaths
14th-century Mongolian women
Yuan dynasty empresses
14th-century Chinese women
14th-century Chinese people